Oliva ozodona is a species of sea snail, a marine gastropod mollusk in the family Olividae, the olives.

Subspecies
 Oliva ozodona nellyae T. Cossignani, 2017
 Oliva ozodona nitidula Duclos, 1835
 Oliva ozodona ozodona Duclos, 1835
 Oliva ozodona sandwicensis Pease, 1860

Description

Distribution
This marine species occurs off French Guiana and in Melanesia to the Philippines

References

 Petuch E.J. & Sargent D.M. (1986). Atlas of the living olive shells of the world. xv + 253 pp., 39 pls
La famille des Olividae Latreille, 1825 (Neogastropoda). Le genre Oliva Bruguière, 1789, aux Antilles et en Guyane françaises. Description de Oliva lilacea nov. sp. Bulletin de la Société Linnéenne de Bordeaux 41(4) "2013": 437-454, sér. 148, nouvelle série
 Vervaet F.L.J. (2018). The living Olividae species as described by Pierre-Louis Duclos. Vita Malacologica. 17: 1-111

ozodona
Gastropods described in 1835